Deco (born 1977) is the nickname of Portuguese footballer Anderson Luís de Souza.

Deco or DECO may also refer to:

DECO Cassette System, a software loader by Data East
DECO Online, a 2005 computer game
Deco Refreshments, Inc., a restaurant chain
Deco Vs. Deco, a 2008 DVD by the Japanese rock band Maximum the Hormone
, an Italian supermarket and sponsor of the 2022 Serie B season
The Deco, a restored 1930s cinema and theatre in Northampton, England
Data East Corporation, a software company
Decompression (diving), scuba diving slang
Demos Commander, an orthodox file manager for Unix-like systems
Gustavo Deco, Argentinian and Italian neuroscientist

See also
Art Deco (disambiguation)